Nicodemo Ferrucci (1574–1650) was an Italian painter of the Baroque period, active mainly in Rome. He was born in Fiesole. He was the pupil of the painter Domenico Passignano and assisted him with frescoes in Rome. Ferrucci was also a prolific painter of portraits, including contemporary artists from Tuscany.

References

Further reading

1574 births
1650 deaths
People from Fiesole
16th-century Italian painters
Italian male painters
17th-century Italian painters
Painters from Tuscany
Italian Baroque painters